= Gen. nov. 70, sp. 1 =

Gen. nov. 70, sp. 1 is a shorthorned grasshopper of the Acrididae family found in north Australian savannas.
